Live at the Half Note is a live album by American jazz saxophonists Lee Konitz and Warne Marsh recorded at the Half Note in 1959 accompanied by Bill Evans, Jimmy Garrison, and Paul Motian. It was first released on the Verve label in 1994 as a double CD set.

Critical reception

Scott Yanow, writing for Allmusic, stated: "They perform a dozen extended standards (or "originals" based on the chord changes of familiar tunes) with creativity and inspiration. In fact, of all the Konitz-Marsh recordings, this set ranks near the top".

Track listing 
Disc one
 "Palo Alto" (Lee Konitz) – 9:13
 "How About You?" (Burton Lane, Ralph Freed) – 9:15
 "My Melancholy Baby" (Ernie Burnett, George Norton) – 6:54
 "Scrapple from the Apple" (Charlie Parker) – 7:53
 "You Stepped Out of a Dream" (Nacio Herb Brown, Gus Kahn) – 7:39
 "317 East 32nd Street" (Lennie Tristano) – 7:44

Disc two
 "April" (Tristano) – 8:44
 "It's You or No One" (Jule Styne, Sammy Cahn) – 8:09
 "Just Friends" (John Klenner, Sam M. Lewis) – 5:40
 "Baby, Baby All the Time" (Bobby Troup) – 8:31
 "Lennie-Bird" (Tristano) – 8:39
 "Subconscious Lee" (Konitz) – 7:41

Personnel 
Lee Konitz – alto saxophone
Warne Marsh – tenor saxophone
Bill Evans – piano
Jimmy Garrison – bass
Paul Motian – drums

References 

Lee Konitz live albums
1994 live albums
Verve Records live albums